Khoshkamrud or Khoshkemrud, also rendered as Khoshkeh Marrud or Khoshkeh Marud or Khushgeh Marud, also known as Voshkamaru, may refer to:
 Khoshkamrud-e Olya
 Khoshkamrud-e Sofla